Alexandra Boulat (2 May 1962 – 5 October 2007) was a French photographer born in Paris. In 2001, she co-founded the VII Photo Agency. Her work has appeared in many magazines, including Time, Newsweek, Paris Match and National Geographic Magazine and she received numerous international awards.

Life and work
She was trained in graphic art and art history at the École des Beaux-Arts in Paris.

Before co-founding the VII Photo Agency in 2001 she had been represented by Sipa Press and by her mother's agency, Cosmos.

Since 2006 she had been concentrating primarily on the conflict in Gaza.

In June 2007, she suffered a ruptured brain aneurysm, and spent three weeks in a hospital in Israel in a medically induced coma. She was moved to France, where she remained in a coma. Thousands of colleagues and fans had expressed support for her. Boulat died in her sleep in Paris on 5 October 2007.

References

External links
Boulat 's bio at VII Photo Agency
Obituary in The Guardian, 13 October 2007
Obituary in The Times, 9 October 2007
New York Times: Alexandra Boulat, War Photographer, Is Dead at 45
Time's Tribute - Photo Essay
Capturing Gaza's Hell - A multimedia presentation, narrated by Boulat

1962 births
2007 deaths
French photographers
Artists from Paris
French women photographers
20th-century French women artists
VII Photo Agency photographers
20th-century women photographers
Women photojournalists